The korfball event at the World Games 2017 took place in Wrocław, Poland.

Qualification
A total of 8 teams competed in the korfball event at the World Games 2017.

The 2015 IKF World Korfball Championship (IKF WKC) acted as the qualification tournament. Seven teams qualified for the World Games, including all non-European teams finishing in the top 11. The remaining slots were filled by the top European teams in the competition, except for Poland which is the host country of the World Games 2017.

Qualified teams

Preliminary round

Group A

Group B

Knockout stage

5–8th place semifinals

Semifinals

Seventh place game

Fifth place game

Third place game

Final

Final ranking

References

External links
 Results book

2017 World Games
2017 in korfball
2017
Korfball in Poland